The limestone Kendall County Courthouse and Jail are located in the San Antonio suburb of Boerne in the U.S. state of Texas. They were added to the National Register of Historic Places in 1980 and the courthouse as a Recorded Texas Historic Landmark in 1970.

The courthouse was built as one storey in 1870 on land donated by local surveyor John James, and the limestone blocks came from local quarries. Philip Zoeller and S. F. Stendeback were the designers.  In 1886, a second storey was added by Charles Buckel. Alfred Giles was contracted to add the 1909 front facade. The courthouse was in service until 1998, when Kendall County built a new courthouse across the street.

The 1887 limestone jail was designed and built by Pauly Jail Building and Manufacturing Company.

See also

National Register of Historic Places listings in Kendall County, Texas
Recorded Texas Historic Landmarks in Kendall County

References

External links

Buildings and structures in Kendall County, Texas
County courthouses in Texas
Jails on the National Register of Historic Places in Texas
Courthouses on the National Register of Historic Places in Texas
Recorded Texas Historic Landmarks
Boerne, Texas
National Register of Historic Places in Kendall County, Texas
Jails in Texas